Nansha railway station is a railway station currently under construction in Nansha District, Guangzhou, Guangdong Province, China.

History
Two railways currently under construction, the Nansha Port railway, and the Shenzhen–Zhanjiang high-speed railway, will pass through this station.

Nansha Port railway

Nansha railway station on Nansha Port railway started construction in March 2021. All trains will pass through this station without stopping when the Nansha Port railway opens in late 2021.

Future Development 
A further two planned railways, the Guangzhou–Macao high-speed railway, and the Zhaoqing–Nansha intercity railway, will also serve this station.

Metro station 

Interchanges with Guangzhou Metro Line 15 (in long-term planning) and Line 18 (opened on September 26, 2021)  are planned via Wanqingsha station.

References 

Railway stations in Guangdong